Villars-sur-Var (literally Villars on Var;) is a commune in the Alpes-Maritimes department in the Provence-Alpes-Côte d'Azur region in southeastern France.

History
It was part of the historic County of Nice until 1860 as Villar del Varo.

Population

Twin towns — sister cities
Villars-sur-Var is twinned with Cherasco, Italy since 1981.

See also
Communes of the Alpes-Maritimes department

References

Communes of Alpes-Maritimes
Alpes-Maritimes communes articles needing translation from French Wikipedia